Jena II is an electoral constituency (German: Wahlkreis) represented in the Landtag of Thuringia. It elects one member via first-past-the-post voting. Under the current constituency numbering system, it is designated as constituency 38. It covers the eastern part of Jena.

Jena I was created for the 1994 state election. Since 2009, it has been represented by Gudrun Lukin of The Left.

Geography
As of the 2019 state election, Jena II covers the eastern part of Jena, specifically the city districts (Ortsteile) of Drackendorf, Ilmnitz, Jenaprießnitz/Wogau, Kernberge, Kunitz/Laasan, Lobeda-Altstadt, Löbstedt, Neulobeda, Wenigenjena, Wöllnitz, Ziegenhain, and Zwätzen.

Members
The constituency was first won by the Social Democratic Party (SPD) in 1994, and represented by Gerd Schuchardt. It was won by the Christian Democratic Union (CDU) and in 1999 and represented by Andreas Trautvetter, who was re-elected in 2004. In 2009, the constituency was won by Gudrun Lukin of The Left. She was re-elected in 2014 and 2019.

Election results

2019 election

2014 election

2009 election

2004 election

1999 election

1994 election

References

Electoral districts in Thuringia
1994 establishments in Germany
Jena
Constituencies established in 1994